Amavas Ki Raat (English: new moon night) is a low budget Hindi horror film directed by Mohan Bhakri. This film was released in 1990 and starred by Kiran Kumar, Rakesh Bedi, Kunika and Jagdeep.

Plot
A pregnant lady discarded by the society calls to her sister Nanda for help. Nanda is wife of a powerful Tantrik. She could not save her sister but use her Tantra to gives birth to her dead sisters child. Although her Tantrik husband warns her that this child born in the Amavas Ki Raat may be a demon.

Cast
 Kiran Kumar
 Rakesh Bedi
 Kunika
 Usha Khanna
 Javed Khan (actor)
 Manik Irani
 Jagdeep
 Sunil Dhwan
 Huma Khan
 Rahul singh
 Kamna

References

1990 films
1990s Hindi-language films
Indian horror films
1990 horror films
Hindi-language horror films
1990 direct-to-video films
Indian direct-to-video films

External links